Isopropylmalic acid (isopropylmalate) is an intermediate in the biosynthesis of leucine, synthesized from oxoisovalerate by 2-isopropylmalate synthase and converted into isopropyl-3-oxosuccinate by 3-isopropylmalate dehydrogenase. Two isomers are important, the 2- and 3-isopropyl derivatives, and these are interconverted by isopropylmalate dehydratase.

References

Dicarboxylic acids
Alpha hydroxy acids
Isopropyl compounds